GTPase activating protein and VPS9 domains 1, also known as GAPVD1, Gapex-5 and RME-6 is a protein which in humans is encoded by the GAPVD1 gene.

Function 

GAPVD1 is Rab GTPase guanine nucleotide exchange factor essential for activation of RAB5A during engulfment of apoptotic cells. GAPVD1 is also involved in the degradation of the epidermal growth factor receptor.
Gapex-5 mediated activation of Rab5 has been implicated in the insulin stimulated formation of plasma membrane phosphatidylinositol-3-phosphate.

Structure 
Based on sequence homology, mammalian Gapex-5 has been shown to have an amino-terminal Ras GAP domain, a central polyproline (SH3 binding) region and a carboxy-terminal Rab GEF domain. The RabGEF domain has been suggested to activate Rab5 and Rab31.

References

Further reading